The Church of the Intercession on the Nerl is a Russian Orthodox church and a symbol of medieval Russia.

The church was commissioned by Andrei Bogolyubsky, a 12th-century Russian grand prince. According to some sources, it was built to commemorate Andrei's victory over the Bulgars and his son Izyaslav, who was slain in the battle. The exact date of construction of the church is unknown. The building is constructed in white stone, and has one dome and four columns in the interior. Its proportions are elongated on purpose to make its outline seem slimmer, although this architectural solution restricts its use in holding services.

For centuries, the memorial church greeted everyone approaching the palace at Bogolyubovo. In spring, the area would flood, and the church appeared as if floating on water. The church itself has not been substantially altered, with only the dome's shape being slightly changed, and the addition of porch-galleries in the 12th century, which were rebuilt in 18th century and then demolished. The walls are still covered with 12th-century stone carvings.

In 1992, the church was inscribed on the UNESCO World Heritage List as part of the White Monuments of Vladimir and Suzdal.

Gallery

References

External links
 
 Views of the church
 Panoramic Views of the Church

Intercession on the Nerl
Intercession on the Nerl
Intercession on the Nerl
Religious buildings and structures completed in 1165
Intercession on the Nerl
Vladimir-Suzdal
White Monuments of Vladimir and Suzdal
Cultural heritage monuments of federal significance in Vladimir Oblast